Kansas's at-large congressional district for the United States House of Representatives in the state of Kansas is a defunct congressional district. It existed from statehood January 29, 1861 to March 4, 1907.

List of members representing the district

References

 Congressional Biographical Directory of the United States 1774–present

At-large United States congressional districts
Former congressional districts of the United States
At-large
1861 establishments in Kansas